Transient receptor potential cation channel, subfamily V, member 3, also known as TRPV3, is a human gene encoding the protein of the same name.

The TRPV3 protein belongs to a family of nonselective cation channels that function in a variety of processes, including temperature sensation and vasoregulation. The thermosensitive members of this family are expressed in subsets of human sensory neurons that terminate in the skin, and are activated at distinct physiological temperatures. This channel is activated at temperatures between 22 and 40 degrees C. The gene lies in close proximity to another family member (TRPV1) gene on chromosome 17, and the two encoded proteins are thought to associate with each other to form heteromeric channels.

Function 
The TRPV3 channel has wide tissue expression that is especially high in the skin (keratinocytes) but also in the brain. It functions as a molecular sensor for innocuous warm temperatures. Mice lacking these protein are unable to sense elevated temperatures (>33 °C) but are able to sense cold and noxious heat. In addition to thermosensation TRPV3 channels seem to play a role in hair growth because mutations in the TRPV3 gene cause hair loss in mice. The role of TRPV3 channels in the brain is unclear, but appears to play a role in mood regulation.  The protective effects of the natural product, incensole acetate were partially mediated by TRPV3 channels.

Modulation 

The TRPV3 channel is directly activated by various natural compounds like carvacrol, thymol and eugenol. Several other monoterpenoids which cause either feeling of warmth or are skin sensitizers can also open the channel. Monoterpenoids also induce agonist-specific desensitization of TRPV3 channels in a calcium-independent manner.

Resolvin E1 (RvE1), RvD2, and 17R-RvD1 (see resolvins)  are metabolites of the omega 3 fatty acids, eicosapentaenoic acid (for RvE1) or docosahexaenoic acid (for RvD2 and 17R-RvD1). These metabolites are members of the specialized proresolving mediators (SPMs) class of metabolites that function to resolve diverse inflammatory reactions and diseases in animal models and, it is proposed, humans. These SPMs also dampen pain perception arising from various inflammation-based causes in animal models. The mechanism behind their pain-dampening effects involves the inhibition of TRPV3, probably (in at least certain cases) by an indirect effect wherein they activate other receptors located on neurons or nearby microglia or astrocytes. CMKLR1, GPR32, FPR2, and NMDA receptors have been proposed to be the receptors through which these SPMs operate to down-regulate TRPV3 and thereby pain perception.

2-Aminoethoxydiphenyl borate (2-APB) is a mixed agonist-antagonist of the TRPV3 receptor, acting as an antagonist at low concentrations but showing agonist activity when used in larger amounts. Drofenine also acts as a TRPV3 agonist in addition to its other actions. Conversely, icilin has been shown to act as a TRPV3 antagonist, as well as a TRPM8 agonist. Forsythoside B acts as a TRPV3 inhibitor among other actions. Farnesyl pyrophosphate is an endogenous agonist of TRPV3, while incensole acetate from frankincense also acts as an agonist at TRPV3. TRPV3-74a is a selective TRPV3 antagonist.

Ligands

Agonists 

 Cannabidiol
 Tetrahydrocannabivarin
 Cannabigerolic acid
 Cannabigerovarin

See also
 TRPV
Endocannabinoid system
Endocannabinoidome

References

Further reading

External links 
 

Ion channels